Julio Iglesias is the best selling international artist in Brazil with over 15 million records sold and also one of the best-selling artists worldwide, with 100 million records sold in 14 languages and released 80 albums, and more than 2,600 gold and platinum records certified. He holds the Guinness World Records for the Best-selling Male Latin Artist.

This list contains all studio and live albums of original materials of Spanish singer Julio Iglesias.

Albums

Studio albums

1960s

1970s

1980s

1990s

2000s/2010s

Notes
A  Romantic Classics did not charted in Top Latin Albums, but it did in Billboard 200 where its peak was the position 41.

Live albums

Compilation albums

Singles

1960s

1970s

1980s

1990s

2000s/2010s

As featured artist

Other appearances

References

Discographies of Spanish artists
Latin pop music discographies
disco